The Battle of Kilosa was fought during the East African Campaign of World War I. It was an example of a successful pincer movement which encircled the isolated British column.

References

Battles of the East African Campaign
1916 in Africa